Stewart–Hinton House is a historic home located at Petersburg, Virginia. It was built about 1798, and is a two-story, five bay, Federal style brick dwelling.  It has a low hipped roof and four rectangular interior end chimneys. The interior features a first-floor hall with arched entrance, elaborate cornice, flat-paneled dado, an unsupported stair and an unusual double-pile parlor with two fireplaces.

It was listed on the National Register of Historic Places in 2004.

References

External links

Hinton House, 416 High Street, Petersburg, Petersburg, VA: 6 photos at Historic American Buildings Survey

Historic American Buildings Survey in Virginia
Houses on the National Register of Historic Places in Virginia
Federal architecture in Virginia
Houses completed in 1798
Houses in Petersburg, Virginia
National Register of Historic Places in Petersburg, Virginia